The First national architectural movement, also referred to in Turkey as the National architectural Renaissance, or Turkish Neoclassical architecture was a period of Turkish architecture that was most prevalent between 1908 and 1930 but continued until the end of the 1930s. Inspired by Ottomanism, the movement sought to capture classical elements of Ottoman and Seljuk architecture and use them in the construction of modern buildings. Despite the style focusing on Ottoman aspects, it was most prevalent during the first decade of the Republic of Turkey.

The most important architects of the movement were Ahmet Kemaleddin and Vedat Tek, who pioneered the movement, as well as Arif Hikmet Koyunoğlu and Ottoman-born architect of Italian descent .

History

The movement began in the early 20th-century in the capital of the Ottoman Empire, Constantinople, with the goal of bringing back "Turkish" elements in the construction and design of new buildings. Ever since the late 18th century, European architectural movements such as Baroque, Neoclassical and Rococo architecture were the styles chosen for the majority of imperial buildings built up until the early 20th century.

The first building considered to be built in the Turkish neoclassical style is the Grand Post Office (1905–09), by Vedat Bey in Sirkeci. The building brought back classical Ottoman elements from the 16th century such as two-color stone workmanship and Islamic geometric patterns. This kick-started the movement which was then given the name New Ottoman architecture. After the Young Turk Revolution in 1908, the new government promoted Ottoman Revival architecture as a contrast to the many buildings built in western European styles. New government buildings as well as public buildings constructed during the last decade of the empire were mainly designed in the New Ottoman style such as the 7th Eyüp Reşadiye High-school (1911), Beşiktaş Pier (1913), Aviation Martyrs' Monument (1916) as well as the new headquarters for the Committee of Union and Progress, which would later become the first Grand National Assembly building when completed, in 1920. Even after the end of World War I, during the allied occupation of Constantinople, construction of new buildings continued in this style. The Tayyare Apartments, by Ahmet Kemaleddin, were built between 1918 and 1922, during the occupation.

After the Turkish War of Independence and subsequent formation of the Republic of Turkey, the new government, led by President Mustafa Kemal, further promoted the architectural style which would live out its golden years in the 1920s. Subsequent government buildings such as the second Grand National Assembly building (1924), the Ministry of Finance general headquarters (1925) and the Ministry of Culture general headquarters (1927) were all built with Turkish Neoclassical architecture.

Due to the high demand of buildings and lack of Turkish architects, Western influences once again took hold in the architecture of the 1930s. The Turkish government brought in several European architects, such as Clemens Holzmeister and Ernst Egli, to design many buildings during this period. This however did bring forth a mix of modern architecture with Turkish Neoclassical, most notably seen in the Sivas station building (1934).

The mix of architectural styles led forth to the Second national architectural movement (1939-1950).

Examples

Notable buildings

Grand Post Office (1909) in Sirkeci, Istanbul.
Land Registry General Directorate Building (1908)
Adana station building (1912) in Kurtuluş, Adana
Beşiktaş Pier (1913) in Beşiktaş, Istanbul.
Karaağaç station building (1914) in Karaağaç, Edirne
Vedat Tek House in Nişantaşı, Istanbul.
First Grand National Assembly Building (1920) in Ulus, Ankara
Tayyare Apartments (1922) in Laleli, Istanbul.
Second Grand National Assembly Building (1924) in Ulus, Ankara
Gazi station building (1926) in Ankara
Elhamra Theater (1926) in Konak, İzmir
Ministry of Culture General Headquarters (1927) in Sıhhiye, Ankara
Ankara Palas (1928) in Ulus, Ankara
Ziraat Bankası General Headquarters Building (1929)  in Ulus, Ankara.
State Art and Sculpture Museum (1930) in Altındağ, Ankara.
Ethnography Museum of Ankara (1928) in Ulus, Ankara.
Second Evkaf Apartments (1930) in Ulus, Ankara.

See also
Architecture of Turkey

References

External links

 
Architecture in Turkey
Revival architectural styles
Architectural styles
Ottoman architecture
Seljuk architecture
20th-century architecture